Lim Wee Kiak  (born 1968) is a Singaporean politician and ophthalmologist. A member of the governing People's Action Party (PAP), he has been the Member of Parliament (MP) representing the Canberra division of Sembawang GRC since 2006.

Education
Lim attended Sembawang School, The Chinese High School and Hwa Chong Junior College before graduating from Yong Loo Lin School of Medicine at the National University of Singapore in 1992 with a Bachelor of Medicine, Bachelor of Surgery degree.

After completing his housemanship, Lim served as a medical officer in the Ministry of Health (MOH) between 1992 and 1994. Lim then served in the Singapore Armed Forces (SAF) as a medical officer in 1994 before signing on as a regular.

Lim subsequently went on to complete a Master of Medicine degree in ophthalmology at Yong Loo Lin School of Medicine at the National University of Singapore.

He went on to pursue two specialist postgraduate qualifications in ophthalmology from the Royal College of Surgeons of Edinburgh and Royal College of Ophthalmologists.

Lim also did a one-year clinical and research fellowship in ocular immunology and inflammation at the National Eye Institute of the National Institutes of Health in 2003.

Career 
Lim is currently co-founder and group vice chairman of Eagle Eye Centre. Prior to joining Eagle Eye Centre, Lim was a consultant and a sub-specialist in ocular immunology and inflammation at the Singapore National Eye Centre. He is an adviser to the Singapore Opticianry Practitioners, chairman of the advisory board of the Ngee Ann Polytechnic School of Optometry. Lim is also a member of the International Uveitis Study Group, International Ocular Inflammation Society, and the American Uveitis Society.

Lim was the deputy director of the National Healthcare Group Eye Institute from 2007 to 2009. He was also a visiting consultant to the Singapore National Eye Centre from 2006 to 2017 and Tan Tock Seng Hospital from 2004 to 2019.

Lim has been an ophthalmologist since 1998 and provides specialised eye care for patients with common ophthalmological conditions such as cataract and short-sightedness and sub-specialist eye care for patients with ocular inflammation at his clinics at Mount Elizabeth Novena Hospital, Mount Alvernia Hospital, Parkway East Hospital and Royal Square Novena.

Military career
Lim served in the Singapore Armed Forces between 1995 and 2003 as a medical officer before attaining the rank Major. He served as the team leader of the Singapore medical team attached to the United Nations Hospital in East Timor.

Political career

2006 general election 
Lim contested in the 2006 general election as part of a six-member People's Action Party (PAP) team for the Sembawang Group Representation Constituency (GRC). The team then led by Minister for Health Khaw Boon Wan, won over 76% of the votes. Lim was appointed to the Public Accounts Committee and chairman for the Transport Government Parliamentary Committee.

2011 general election 
Lim then contested in the 2011 general election as part of a five-member PAP team for the Nee Soon GRC. The team, then led by the Minister for Law K. Shanmugam, won over 58% of the votes. Lim was appointed to the Public Petitions Committee. Lim was also appointed as a member of the Finance and Trade & Industry Government Parliamentary Committee. Subsequently, Lim became Chairman of the Defence and Foreign Affairs Government Parliamentary Committee.

During an interview with Lianhe Zaobao in May 2011, Lim commented that Singapore's ministers need to have a high salary to maintain dignity when talking to CEOs or the CEOs may not be receptive to the ministers' suggestion or proposals. The comments created a outcry and Lim defended himself saying a balance point is needed. Lim subsequently apologised for it, claiming it was taken out of context and there are several more points to it during the interview.

2015 general election 
Subsequently, Lim's Canberra ward returned to the Sembawang GRC and he was part of a five-member PAP team led by then Minister for National Development, and Chairman of the PAP, Khaw Boon Wan. The team won over 72% of the votes. Lim was appointed to the Public Accounts Committee and made chairperson for the Culture, Community, and Youth Government Parliamentary Committee.

2020 general election 
Lim successfully defended his seat in Sembawang GRC as part of a five-member team led by Minister for Education Ong Ye Kung. The PAP defeated the NSP with 67.29% of the popular vote.

Personal life 
Lim is married to Lee Ai Ling, who is the managing director of Eagle Eye Centre. They have three children.

References

External links
 Lim Wee Kiak on Parliament of Singapore

People's Action Party politicians
Members of the Parliament of Singapore
Singaporean ophthalmologists
Hwa Chong Junior College alumni
Singaporean politicians of Chinese descent
1968 births
Living people